The Teatro degli Arcimboldi is a theatre and opera house in Milan. It was built over a 27-month period in anticipation of the closure and subsequent nearly three-year-long renovation of Milan's La Scala opera house in December 2001.  It is located 4.5 miles from the city centre in a converted Pirelli tire factory, in an area known as Bicocca.

Designed by Vittorio Gregotti in collaboration with Mario Botta and Elisabetta Fabbri, the fan-shaped, two-level, 2,375-seat auditorium was inaugurated with a performance of Verdi's La traviata on 19 January 2002, and went on to allow the continuation of La Scala's 2001/2002 opera season. Following La Scala reopening on 7 December 2004, Teatro degli Arcimboldi expanded its program, hosting musicals and performances of jazz, classical and pop music.

Sources
Beauvert, Thierry, Opera Houses of the World,  New York: The Vendome Press, 1995
Lynn, Karyl Charna, Italian Opera Houses and Festivals,  Lanham, Maryland: The Scarecrow Press, Inc., 2005. 
Plantamura, Carol, The Opera Lover's Guide to Europe,  Secaucus, New Jersey: Carol Publishing Group/Citadel Press, 1996,

See also
Teatro alla Scala
List of opera houses
Radio Marconi

References
Notes

External links
 Teatro degli Arcimboldi official website with photos (mostly in Italian)
La Scala official website

Theatres in Milan
Teatro degli Arcimboldi
Opera houses in Italy
Theatres completed in 2002
Music venues completed in 2002
2002 establishments in Italy
Mario Botta buildings
Tourist attractions in Milan
Opera in Milan